Pseudodaphnella spyridula is a species of sea snail, a marine gastropod mollusk in the family Raphitomidae.

Description
The length of the shell attains 4 mm, its diameter 1 mm.

The very minute shell is narrow, white, latticed, and cancellate, the junctions of these cancellated lirae being gemmuled The shell contains six whorls, two being apical. The aperture is sinuous. The siphonal canal is very short. The outer lip shows eight minute denticules. The sinus is wide and effuse. The columella is straight, and of simple character

Distribution
This marine species occurs off the Loyalty Islands; off Mactan Island, Philippines

References

External links
 
 Li B.-Q. [Baoquan & Li X.-Z. [Xinzheng] (2014) Report on the Raphitomidae Bellardi, 1875 (Mollusca: Gastropoda: Conoidea) from the China Seas. Journal of Natural History 48(17-18): 999-1025]

spyridula
Gastropods described in 1896